Sir Lucas Dillon (died 1593), also called Luke, was a leading Irish barrister and judge of the Elizabethan era who held the offices of Attorney General for Ireland and Chief Baron of the Irish Exchequer. He supported the Lord Deputy Henry Sidney in the cess controversy and the Lord Deputy John Perrot in the Desmond Rebellions. He was held in high regard by Queen Elizabeth, but was accused by his enemies of corruption and maladministration.

Birth and origins 

Lucas was born in 1529 or 1530, the eldest son of Sir Robert Dillon and his wife Genet (also called Elizabeth) Barnewall. His father, called of Newtown,  pursued a judicial career and would in 1558 become Chief Justice of the Irish Common Pleas. His father's family was Old English and descended from Sir Henry Dillon who had come to Ireland with Prince John in 1185 during the Anglo-Norman invasion of Ireland.

Lucas's mother was a younger daughter of Edward Barnewall of Crickstown. Her family also was Old English and descended from Michael de Berneval who had come to Ireland in the time of Henry II of England (12th century).

He had three brothers and three sisters (see his father's article).

Early life 
He entered the Middle Temple, London, in 1561, was called to the Bar, and then returned to Ireland to practice law. His rise in the legal profession was rapid: he became Principal Solicitor for Ireland in 1565. He bought an estate at Moymet, near Trim, County Meath, on which he built Moymet House, where he lived in 1565, now a ruin. Moymet is near the older family estate of Newtown Abbey that had been given to his father. Dillon later also acquired lands in County Cavan. He also owned a townhouse in Nicholas Street in Dublin.

First marriage and children 
Dillon married about 1565 Jane Bathe, daughter of James Bathe by his second wife Elizabeth Burnell. His father in law was Chief Baron of the Irish Exchequer.

 
Lucas and Jane had seven sons:
 James (c. 1570 – 1641), became the 1st Earl of Roscommon in 1622
 Henry (died 1609) of Kentstown in County Meath
 Christopher
 Oliver
 Alexander
 John, either died childless or married a daughter of Sir William Sarsfield of Lucan
 Robert

—and five daughters:
 Genet, married Christopher Plunkett, 9th Baron Killeeen and was mother of Luke Plunket, 1st Earl of Fingall.
 Eleanor (died 1607), married Robert Rochfort of Kilbride, ancestor of the prominent Rochfort family
 Elizabeth
 Margaret, married John Sarsfield of Shurninges
 Anne, married Richard Plunket of Rathmore

Further career 
He was promoted Attorney General for Ireland on 8 November 1566.

Member of Parliament 
He sat in the Irish House of Commons as one of the two knights of the shire for Meath in Elizabeth's 2nd Irish Parliament (1569–1571).

Elevation to the Bench 
In 1570 he succeeded his father-in-law James Bathe as chief baron of the Irish exchequer, rather against the wishes of the Irish legal profession, most of whom would have preferred the second Baron of the Exchequer, Robert Cusack. The final decision rested with Queen Elizabeth, who wrote that while she heard very good reports of Cusack, Dillon had the stronger claim (the precise reason for the Queen's preference remains obscure, but her judgment in such matters was usually sound). Cusack's supporters praised him as "a true Protestant", whereas Dillon was known to incline privately to the Roman Catholic faith, and in his last years made little effort to conceal the fact. However, the English Crown, while it made intermittent efforts to appoint judges with strongly Protestant views, would as a rule accept outward adherence to the Church of Ireland as sufficient evidence of loyalty, and Dillon's private religious opinions, which were shared by several of his colleagues, were thus not a bar to advancement. In any event, Cusack died later the same year.

Judge 
Until his last years, Dillon was held in high regard by the English Crown. Sir William Gerard, the Lord Chancellor of Ireland, described him as an energetic reformer, who was diligent in attending the Privy Council and the Court of Castle Chamber (the Irish equivalent of the English Star Chamber). He was seen as one of the few Irish judges of real eminence, at a time when the Crown authorities ranked the competances of most of his colleagues below that of an inexperienced junior member of the English Bar.

Sidney 
Dillon was particularly close to Sir Henry Sidney, the Lord Deputy of Ireland, who called him "my faithful Dillon". Sidney knighted him in 1575.

He was one of Sidney's few influential supporters during the so-called "cess controversy", the much-resented attempt to impose a tax for the upkeep of military garrisons on the gentry of the Pale, and became rather unpopular as a result. His membership of a five-man commission empowered to fine those landowners who refused to pay the cess was a particular source of irritation, especially as he was its only Irish member. 

Like Gerard, Dillon was a firm believer in the benefits of extending the common law to all parts of Ireland, and of encouraging the settlement of all grievances by resort to law. In general he favoured moderation rather than coercion, although he would where required by the Crown carry out repressive measures. He played a considerable part in putting down the Desmond Rebellions and the rebellion of William Nugent. Sidney did however express concerns about Dillon's increasing ill-health, which he feared might make him incapable of performing his duties as a judge. In September 1578 the Queen recalled Sidney and he was replaced by William Drury, as only Lord Justice of Ireland.

Second marriage 
Dillon married secondly in 1575 Marion Sherle (or Shurle), daughter of Patrick Sherle of Shallon, County Meath, and widow of Sir Christopher Barnewall of Turvey House. The marriage stayed childless, but Marion had many daughters from her first marriage; one of them, Eleanor (or Helen), married her stepfather's eldest son, James Dillon. Marion would die as his widow in 1607 but be buried beside her first husband in Lusk church.

Later years 
Dillon inherited the family's lands at Newtown on his father's death in 1579. Older sources give his father's year of death as 1680.

Execution of Nicholas Nugent 
Lucas's reputation suffered greatly through his sitting, together with his cousin Robert Dillon, as a judge in the trial of Nicholas Nugent for treason in 1582. Nicholas was accused of treason in the context of the rebellion of his nephew William Nugent. There had been a long and bitter feud between the Nugent and Dillon families. Nicholas had recently been appointed Chief Justice of the Common Pleas and Lucas's cousin Robert Dillon reportedly hoped to take Nugent's place. The trial of a senior judge on a treason charge was without precedent in England or Ireland. Both Dillons should have been disqualified from sitting as judges at his trial as one of the charges was that Nugent had plotted to kill them. The trial ended with Nugent's conviction and execution (on 6 April 1582), which caused grave public disquiet, (although he did at least have the benefit of trial by jury), and led to a claim that Irish-born judges were incapable of administering impartial justice. The Queen for a time altered her favourable opinion of Lucas, but after obtaining a series of private audiences with her during a lengthy visit to London in 1582 and 1583 he was restored to favour.

Perrot 
Dillon was by now acquiring powerful enemies, notably Thomas Butler, 10th Earl of Ormond, but he also had friends, including the new Lord Deputy, Sir John Perrot, appointed 1584. He was spoken of as a likely Lord Chancellor of Ireland, although his critics said that he was too corrupt for the post. Queen Elizabeth thought highly of him, apart from a period of coolness in their relationship after the death of Nicholas Nugent, and at one point was said to have offered him the office of Lord Chief Justice of Ireland (i.e. Chief Justice of the Queen's Bench). If the offer was made, it seems that his enemies had enough influence to block it. As some consolation for his failure to attain higher office he was in 1583 made Seneschal of the barony of Kilkenny West.

As Perrot's Deputyship became increasingly embattled, Dillon, his ally, was also attacked: Adam Loftus, Archbishop of Dublin accused him of recusancy, a very serious charge to make against a servant of the Crown, and informed the London government that he was "very corrupt". The charge of recusancy at least had a grain of truth, since Lucas was widely known to favour the old religion. William Nugent, who had received a royal pardon for his rebellion against the Crown, made a concerted attack on Sir Robert Dillon, who was by now Lord  Chief Justice, and for a time had him suspended from office. Lucas was also attacked by Nugent, although he was not charged with any crime, even after Perrot's final downfall in 1593, not long before his own death. The stress of defending himself against charges of corruption is said to have hastened his end, although he was, in any case, an old man by the standards of the time, and had been in ill health for some years.

Death, tomb, and timeline 
Dillon died on 17 February 1593 in Dublin, He was succeeded on 10 April in his office as chief baron of the exchequer by Sir Robert Napier.

He was buried beside his first wife, Jane Bathe, in the Clonburn parish church, the ruin of which still stands next to Newtown Abbey, near Trim, County Meath. Their monument is an altar tomb. Its chest is crowned by the couple's recumbent effigies in high relief. The tomb is nicknamed "the tomb of the jealous man and woman", perhaps because the effigies are separated by a sword of state.

A Latin inscription, not visible any more on the tomb, gave the 17 February as the date of death and his age as 64.

Reputation 
Lucas Dillon's record as a judge and as a statesman has received a somewhat mixed verdict from historians. F. Elrington Ball points to the charges of corruption made against him and his improper conduct of the Nugent trial. Crawford on the other hand praises his talent and energy, points to the high regard most Crown officials had for him, and argues that the charges of corruption made against him were partisan in nature. It is significant that Queen Elizabeth, who was noted for her skill in choosing good public servants, thought highly of him.

Notes and references

Notes

Citations

Sources 

  – 1558 to 1578
  – 1221 to 1690
  – Leinster (continued: Carlow, Kildare, Queen's County, King's County, Meath, Westmeath, Longford, Louth) & Munster
 
  – (the subject)
  – N to R (for Roscommon)
 
 
  – (for timeline)
  – (Preview)
 
 
  – Viscounts (for Dillon)
  – (the subject's father)
 
 
 
  – Knights bachelors & Index
 
 

1530 births
1593 deaths
16th-century Irish politicians
Attorneys-General for Ireland
Chief Barons of the Irish Exchequer
Irish MPs 1569–1571
Members of the Parliament of Ireland (pre-1801) for County Meath constituencies
People from County Meath
People of Elizabethan Ireland
Principal Solicitors for Ireland
Year of birth uncertain